John Fraser Griffiths  (died 1971) was a South African who worked as a British colonial official. As Accountant-General of Fiji between 1955 and 1968, he also served in the Legislative Council.

Biography
Born in what became South Africa, Griffiths worked for Standard Bank between 1930 and 1937. He then joined the Colonial Service. He joined the Royal Air Force during World War II and was badly injured in a crash.

Having worked in Basutoland and Nyasaland, in 1953 he moved to Fiji to become Deputy Accountant-General. Two years later, he was promoted to Accountant-General. As a result of his position, he served in the Legislative Council as an official member. He was made an OBE in the 1965 New Year Honours. The following year he became the first chair of the  Fiji National Provident Fund.

Griffiths retired in 1968 and died in London in 1971.

References

South African accountants
South African military personnel of World War II
Basutoland people
Nyasaland people
Colony of Fiji people
Members of the Legislative Council of Fiji
Officers of the Order of the British Empire
1971 deaths